Odontosiro is a genus of harvestmen belonging to the family Sironidae.

Species:
 Odontosiro lusitanicus Juberthie, 1961

References

Harvestmen